Jacco Eltingh and Tom Kempers were the defending champions, but none competed this year.

Johan Donar and Ola Jonsson won the title by defeating Horacio de la Peña and Vojtěch Flégl 5–7, 6–3, 6–4 in the final.

Seeds

Draw

Draw

References

External links
 Official results archive (ATP)
 Official results archive (ITF)

Campionati Internazionali di Sicilia
1992 ATP Tour
Camp